Cummeen Court Cairn is a court cairn and National Monument located in County Sligo, Ireland.

Location

History
This court cairn was built c. 4000–2500 BC, in the Neolithic.

Description

References

National Monuments in County Sligo
Archaeological sites in County Sligo
Burial monuments and structures in Ireland
Stone circles in Ireland